The system of education in Uganda has a structure of 7 years of primary education, 6 years of secondary education (divided into 4 years of lower secondary and 2 years of upper secondary school), and 3 to 5 years of post-secondary education. Education in Uganda is administered in English. All through out the levels in the education structure, modules are taught and assessed in English. The government of Uganda recognizes education as a basic human right and continues to strive to provide free primary education to all children in the country. However, issues with funding, teacher training, rural populations, and inadequate facilities continue to hinder the progress of educational development in Uganda. Girls in Uganda are disproportionately discriminated against in terms of education; they face harsher barriers when trying to gain an education and it has left the female population disenfranchised, despite government efforts to close the gap.

Primary education

The present system of education, known as Universal Primary Education (UPE), has existed since 1997, and its introduction was the result of democratisation and open elections, as there was popular support for free education.  Despite its promising boosts in enrolment, issues with funding and organisation have continued to plague the UPE.  In 1999 there were six million pupils receiving primary education, compared to only two million in 1986. Numbers received a boost in 1997 when free primary education was made available to four children per family. According to UgStandard, one of the authoritative publications in Uganda, only some of primary school graduates go on to take any form of secondary education.

This is contingent upon their passing their Primary Leaving Examinations (PLE).

Uganda is one of East Africa's developing countries, bordered by Tanzania, Rwanda, the Democratic Republic of the Congo, South Sudan, and Kenya. It occupies  and has 26,404,543 people. According to CIA World Fact Book 2004, more than 80 percent of its population is rural and 35% of the people lives below poverty line. The United Nations characterised the current condition of Uganda with its unstable government and struggling people as "the world’s worst humanitarian crisis."

In 1997 the Ugandan government introduced the Universal Primary Education (UPE) program to improve enrollment and attainment in primary schools. It was initially realized to provide free education for four children per family, but the program was not performing based in its regulations due to the complex structure of Ugandan families. Most Ugandan families have more than four children and households started sending every child, which resulted in a rapid increase in student enrollment in primary schools. Due to the circumstances, President Museveni announced that the UPE was open to all children of all families (Omona 74). When the new policy was executed, schools experienced a massive influx of pupils and the demand for learning materials, teachers, and infrastructure became a challenge to the education system. Ngaka argues that the UPE resulted in costly consequences, including but not limited to a poor quality education, low pupil achievement, untrained teachers, improper infrastructures and classroom settings. The Human Rights Measurement Initiative gives Uganda a score of 92.3% for primary school enrolment.

Uganda has seven years of primary education and the legal age for school entry is six. According to the Ministry of Education and Sports (MoES) statistics, school enrollments increased from three million to 5.3 million in 1997 and the number rapidly increased to seven million by 2004. Even though the increased number of pupils was perceived as a good thing, there were only 125,883 teachers, exceeding the UPE required pupil-teacher ratio of 1:40. The large number of pupils worsens the learning environment and it becomes harder for the teacher to be heard and teach. According to Arbeiter and Hartley, classes have between 70 and 150 pupils and there is over-age studying in all schools. Moyi explains the issue of many classes having the inappropriate age of pupils as having been driven by  late enrolment or grade repetition, which in turn is caused by the poor quality of education. For instance, “third grade included pupils aged between seven to sixteen years and in sixth grade there were pupils up to nineteen years of age."

Secondary education

There is a significant disparity between enrolment rates in primary and secondary schools in Uganda.  Census data from 2004 indicates that for every ten students enrolled in primary schools, only one is enrolled at a secondary institution. The Human Rights Measurement Initiative gives Uganda a score of 36%. The structure of Uganda's secondary education system follows the education system of its former colonial masters, Britain. It is divided into the Ordinary level and Advanced level.

Lower secondary consists of 4 years of schooling at the end of which students undertake Ordinary-level exams (O-level) in at least 8 subjects with a maximum of 10 subjects. Upper secondary consists of 2 years of schooling at the end of which students sit Advanced-level exams (A-level) in at least 3 subjects.

The curriculum for lower secondary is currently being reviewed by the National Curriculum Development Centre, and a new curriculum is expected to be rolled out in 2014 or 2015.

Three-year technical schools provide an alternative to lower secondary school. Alternatives for graduates from lower secondary school include: 2-3 year Technical institutes; 2 year Primary Teacher Colleges (PTC); Department Training Colleges (DTCs) and Upper secondary schools; including:
 Manafwa High School Mbale, mixed day and boarding (s1 to s6)
 Kitante Hill Secondary School - Mixed day school
Seeta High School - Mixed boarding school (S1 to S6)
 St Mary's Secondary School Kitende
Maryhill High School - Boarding girls' School in Mbarara (S.1 to S.6)
Trinity College Nabbingo- Boarding girls' School. (S.1 to S.6)
 St. Mary's College Kisubi - All boy's boarding school
 Mount Saint Mary's College Namagunga - All-girl boarding school (S1 to S6)
 Kibuli Secondary School - Mixed day and boarding school (S1 to S6)
 Bugema Adventist Secondary School - Mixed boarding school(S1 to S6)
 King's College Budo - Mixed boarding school (S1 to S6)
 Gayaza High School - All-girl boarding school (S1 to S6) - Oldest girls secondary school
Transform Educational Centre (Secondary, Kasangati) - Christian Private Secondary School, Mixed
 Uganda Martyrs' Secondary School Namugongo - Mixed Boarding School
 Mengo Senior Secondary School - Mixed day school
 Ndejje Senior Secondary School - Mixed boarding school (S1 to S6)
 Ntare School
Yesu Akwagala high School-Kalungu Masaka. mixed day and boarding
 Nabumali High School
 St. Henry's College Kitovu
 St. Kizito S S Kabowa - Mixed day and boarding school (S1 to S6)
 Makerere College School
 Comboni College
 Kinaawa High School-mugongo- mixed school
 German Secondary School Uganda
 Kiira College Butiki - Boys' boarding school in Jinja (S1 to S6) founded in 1959
 Ebony College Luwero - Mixed day and boarding school (S1 to S6)
 Seat of Wisdom Secondary School- All-girl day and boarding school (S1 to S6)
 Sseguku Hill College- All-girl day and boarding school (S1 to S6)
 Mackay Memorial College Mixed day and boarding school located in Nateete (S1 to S6)
 Serere Township Secondary School- A Christian private "O" and "A" Level Mixed Day and Boarding School
 St.Lawrence Group Of schools.

International schools
Acacia International School
Aga Khan High School
Bethel International Christian School
Delhi Public School International 
Galaxy International School of Uganda
Heritage International School
International School of Uganda
Kampala International School
Rainbow International School
Seven Hills International School
Taibah International School
Hana International School Uganda
Harvest International School - Christian International School
Vienna College Namugongo

Post-secondary education
Although 60,000 to 70,000 students in Uganda leave secondary school each year qualified to go on to higher education, only some 35 percent of them (25,000) are able to find places at the limited number of institutions. The majority of students go to universities, both public and private. Makerere University in Kampala has about half of the total student population in Uganda's universities. The remainder are distributed among the more than 30 private universities and a smaller number of non-university institutions. Recognized universities in Uganda include:

Government universities
Busitema University
Gulu University
Kabale University
Kyambogo University
Makerere University
Mbarara University of Science & Technology
Muni University
Soroti University
Lira University
Mukwaya Johns University in Uganda

Religious-affiliated universities
 African Bible University
 Africa Renewal University, Buloba
 All Saints University
 Ankole Western University
 Bishop Stuart University
 Bugema University
 Busoga University
 Islamic University in Uganda
 Kumi University
 LivingStone International University
 Ndejje Christian University
 Uganda Christian University
 Uganda Martyrs University
 Uganda Pentecostal University
Metropolitan International University
University of Kisubi (UNIK)

Private secular universities
  International University of East Africa

 African Rural University
 Cavendish University Uganda
 International Health Sciences University
 Kayiwa University
 Muteesa I Royal University
 Kampala University
 ISBAT University
 Kampala International University
 Mountains of the Moon University
 Muteesa I Royal University
 Nkumba University
 Royal Open University
 St. Augustine International University
 St. Lawrence University
 Uganda Technology and Management University
 Victoria University
 Nile University

Vocational and technical education

Vocational and Technical Education is a necessary aspect of the education system in Uganda. The UN has led efforts to support this form of education through the UNESCO subdivision International Centre for Technical and Vocational Education and Training (TVET). According to a UN report, "Uganda’s TVET mission is defined as being to ensure that individuals and enterprises acquire the skills they need to raise productivity and income."  These TVET programs range in both complexity and scope.  Some provide for craftsmen or technician level training that replaces standard modes of secondary education, while some TVET programs provide graduate engineering level education to students seeking education at the tertiary or post secondary level.

Literacy programs 

Early literacy movements were characterized by Western aid and leadership and have since given way to a more local decentralized approach to adult and youth literacy in Uganda.  This transition is due in part to the realization of leaders in the West and in Uganda that literacy, and literacy in English particularly, is not a silver bullet for solving Uganda's economic issues.  Much of the literacy work is conducted by NGOs acting on a local level in conjunction with local or village governments.  There is a great demand for these programs, and their rates of return, satisfaction, and literacy retention for graduates have been high.  However, these programs face great challenges including lack of funding, social reluctance, and a general lack of appreciation for literacy and literature.

Northern Uganda
Education is important for a successful post-conflict transition in Northern Uganda (see Conflict in Northern Uganda), as it helps develop peoples' abilities to break free of circles of violence and suffering. Uganda's Universal Primary Education (UPE) has resulted in high enrolment rates in Northern Uganda, but education tends to be of a low quality and few pupils actually complete primary school. There are inadequate facilities; e.g. out of 238 primary schools in Pader, 47 are still under trees, limited teacher accommodation is causing high rates of teacher absenteeism and in some areas the average primary school teacher to student ratio is 1:200.

Furthermore, there is some evidence to suggest completion of secondary school is necessary to provide an individual with a proper chance to escape poverty, as employment and income levels for those who completed primary schools are similar to those who did not attend at all. Their region has particular difficulties as teachers are hard to find, the conflict created a lost generation without an adequate education themselves and teachers from other areas are still highly concerned about security in the region.

Female education 

Literacy discrepancies and educational inequity are a serious factor in the propagation of gender inequality. Female school attendance at all levels of society in Uganda is lower than that of men. This can be attributed to poverty, inadequate infrastructure, social pressures, and early maternity. These barriers continue throughout a woman's life, as one cited challenge to adult females' participation in literacy education in Uganda is home life.  A World Bank report found that a significant force in preventing attendance at adult literacy classes was husbands stopping their wives from attending.  According to United Nations' Girls Education Initiative statistics, literacy rates for young females still lag behind that of young boys by five percent, and nearly half of all girls in Uganda are married before the age of 18. Studies have shown that marriage and pregnancy rates prior to the age of 18 is decreased by roughly 7% when girls receive an extra year of education.

Since 1997, UPE has aimed to bring equality of education to all the children of the country, specifically to those in rural, impoverished areas. It has had controversial results, but overall the UPE program has successfully allowed for higher enrollment, specifically among young girls. However, there is no clarity over whether there are true gender discrimination factors affecting whether the children go to school; it is noted that girls enrollment is dependent upon their age and their mother's level of schooling. Boys, on the other hand, are not affected by their father or mother's education level. Uganda received a score of .517 on the UN Development Programme Gender Equality index as reported in the Human Development Report.  This measure evaluates the respective equality of women in various dimensions including: health, empowerment, and access to labor market.

Uganda implemented the National Strategy for Girls' Education (NSGE) in order to bring equality in the education system for both women and girls and indicates some of the various impediments to them obtaining an education, and particularly secondary education. Ultimately, the NSGE framework is more inclined to identify these barriers rather than offer insight to help overcome these obstacles such as location, menstruation, home responsibilities and overall attitudes within the school domain.

In 2007 the government implemented Universal Secondary Education (USE) with research showing that girls secondary public education enrollment rates increased approximately 49%. This policy is most beneficial to girls of poor households who otherwise would not have had the opportunity to attend due to fees and the general belief that boys secondary education yields more benefits than a girls. There are a few explanations for the increased enrollment aside from the USE policy such as poor or inaccurate reporting of student enrollment, the growing population, and new schools being built or included in the USE policy. Further, the overall performance since the USE has been utilized has decreased in the schools, as teachers are working in worse conditions and students are not as motivated, especially as their parents have now seen education as completely in the realm of the government whereas the policy meant to involve a plethora of actors to support children's education.

The government has attempted various policies targeted at adult education, with inconsistent results. These include: the Functional Adult Literacy (FAL) Programme, Women's Empowerment Programme (WEP), and the National Adult Literacy Strategic Investment Plan (NALSIP). Some results prove that these programmes have bettered the living conditions of women, as they have increased influence in decision making, greater economic accumulation, better self-esteem, and knowledge of their rights in society. However, these results are not widespread; many women do not register for these programmes, especially those in the rural parts of Uganda. The women who do choose to enroll often have low attendance rates or high drop-out rates.

See also
 List of universities in Uganda
 List of Ugandan university leaders
 Education in Africa

References

Ngaka, Willy. Co-Operative Learning In A Universal Primary Education System. International Journal of Learning 13.8 (2006): 171-178. Education Research Complete. Web. 5 Mar. 2014.
Moyi, Peter. Primary School Attendance and Completion Among Lower Secondary School Age Children in Uganda. Current Issues in Education 16. 2 (2013) : 1-16. Print.
Kakuru, Doris M. "HIV/AIDS, Children's Rights And Gender Equality In Uganda's Universal Primary Education." International Journal of Learning 14.2 (2007): 137-148. Education Research Complete. Web. 10 Mar. 2014.
Omana, Julius. Organisational Culture: Uganda's Inspectorate Department of Education. International Journal of Educational Administration. Vol 2, Number 1. 73-99. 2010. Print.

External links
 Uganda Schools Guide
 Education Statistics and Quality of Education in Uganda, Southern and Eastern Africa Consortium for Monitoring Educational Quality (SACMEQ)
 Ministry of Education and Sports, The Republic of Uganda, 
 Education and Sports Sector Fact Sheet 2000 - 2012
 Schools in Uganda